Phattharaphol Khamsuk (simply known as Big, born 22 July 1996) is a Thai footballer who plays as an attacking midfielder or winger for Thai League club  Ratchaburi.

Club career
Phattharaphol is the first Thai football player who played in FA Cup with Hyde United.

References

External links
 Soccerway Biography

1996 births
Living people
Phattharaphol Khamsuk
Phattharaphol Khamsuk
Association football midfielders
Hyde United F.C. players
Phattharaphol Khamsuk
Phattharaphol Khamsuk